Urecheni is a commune in Neamț County, Western Moldavia, Romania. It is composed of three villages: Ingărești, Plugari and Urecheni.

References

Communes in Neamț County
Localities in Western Moldavia